Le Petit-Quevilly (locally ) is a commune in the Seine-Maritime department, region of Normandy, France.

Geography
A residential and light industrial suburb situated inside a meander of the river Seine
on the opposite bank to Rouen city centre, at the junction of the D3 and the N338 roads.

Population

Sports
US Quevilly-Rouen is based in the commune.

Places of interest
 The recently restored church of St. Pierre, dating from the sixteenth century.
 The church of St. Antoine.
 The church of St. Bernadette, dating from the sixteenth century.
 The recently restored chapel of St. Julien, dating from the twelfth century.
 The seventeenth century manorhouse of Queval.
 Vestiges of a Carthusian monastery.
 An old cottonmill, restored and now used as offices and a college.
 Amable-et-Micheline-Lozai Stadium

People
 Daniel Horlaville, retired professional footballer was born here in 1945.
 Patrice Rio, retired professional footballer was born here in 1948.
 Valérie Fourneyron, politician was born here in 1959.
 Catherine Morin-Desailly, politician was born here in 1960.
 Alain Blondel, retired decathlete was born here in 1962.
 Patrick Pouyanné, CEO of Total was born here in 1963.
 Franck Dubosc, actor and comedian was born here in 1963.

See also
Communes of the Seine-Maritime department

References

External links

Official website of Petit Quevilly 

Communes of Seine-Maritime